Beesley Primitive Baptist Church is a historic Primitive Baptist church in Murfreesboro, Tennessee.

It was built in 1913 and added to the National Register in 1999.

References

Baptist churches in Tennessee
Churches on the National Register of Historic Places in Tennessee
Churches completed in 1913
20th-century Baptist churches in the United States
Buildings and structures in Murfreesboro, Tennessee
1913 establishments in Tennessee
Churches in Rutherford County, Tennessee
National Register of Historic Places in Rutherford County, Tennessee
Primitive Baptists